The first IPC Ice Sledge Hockey European Championships was held between April 10, 2005 and April 16, 2005 in the eastern Moravian city of Zlín, Czech Republic. Participating 80 athletes from six nations: Czech Republic, Estonia, Germany, Great Britain, Italy and Sweden. The best European team joined the already qualified teams from Canada, Japan, Norway, Sweden, the USA and host country Italy to the Torino 2006 Paralympic Winter Games.

Final rankings
Germany emerged as the winner of the tournament on goal difference, following a tie with Sweden in both the total number of ranking points and a tie game between the two teams. The final result was based on the total goals 'scored' less the total goals 'scored against'. As a result, the German team qualified for the Torino 2006 Paralympic Winter Games.

Tournament

Tournament summary

See also
 Ice sledge hockey
 Ice hockey#Sledge hockey
 2004 IPC Ice Sledge Hockey World Championships
 Ice sledge hockey at the 2006 Winter Paralympics
 2007 IPC Ice Sledge Hockey European Championships
 2008 IPC Ice Sledge Hockey World Championships

External links
 Results (Archived)
 Statistics
 European Ice Sledge Hockey Team’s Chance to Qualify for Torino 2006 Winter Paralympics
 Euro Sledge 2005

IPC Ice Sledge Hockey European Championships
Sport in Zlín
2005
Sledge
Sledge
April 2005 sports events in Europe